Lock 'n Load Publishing is a developer and publisher of board and computer games, specifically strategy games and wargames. They are based out of Colorado.  From a small three-game beginning, Lock 'n Load Publishing has grown to a game company offering over fifty products including the Nations at War, World at War, Lock 'n Load, Corps Command, Tank on Tank series, Command Ops 2, and a company magazine, Line of Fire. In addition to historical, conflict-centered games, Lock 'n Load Publishing has also branched out into science fiction and horror, with All Things Zombie, Space Infantry, and Nuklear Winter '68.

Company history 

In 2003, Shrapnel Games published the first Lock 'n Load Tactical board game. Titled Forgotten Heroes, the game became an instant hit, selling out within the first year of publication. The next Lock 'n Load Tactical game quickly followed the module with the ANZAC Attack expansion, which also rapidly sold out.

Following the release of the original games, the next title, Band of Heroes, was published through Matrix Games. The game subsequently won the historical game of the year at the 2005 Origins Awards. In 2006, game designer Mark Walker founded Lock 'n Load Publishing.

In July 2014, entered a new stage with David Heath becoming LnLP's new principal owner and business manager. David Heath was the previous CEO/founder of Matrix Games, The Wargamer, and The Gamer's Network before leaving those companies and becoming the CEO of Lock 'n Load Publishing.

David expanded the design and development team, expanding the game titles and broadening its product lines. The new product lines included writing a series of paperback stories, accompanied by audiobooks editions.  Other products and activities included a new sci-fi roleplayer game series, streamlining their popular game series and releasing Starter Kits allowing players to try their game series quickly and cheaply. Lock 'n Load Publishing games are even more accessible, being available for free on virtual gaming platforms such as Vassal and Tabletop simulators and, with the release of the game's Companion books, allowing players to play virtually without needing to own the tabletop board game.

In April 2020, Lock 'n Load Publishing had released, via Steam, its digital computer game line. These include the Tank On Tank, Nations At War, and Lock 'n Load Tactical series games for Windows, Mac, and iPad platforms. The World At War 85 Digital series is currently in development. The computer game, Victory and Glory: The American Civil War, similar to the 2016 predecessor, Victory & Glory: Napoleon (Also with a board game adaptation in 2017), was released for Windows PC in 2020.

Awards 
Lock 'n Load Publishing games have garnered awards from The International Gamers, Origins 2005 Historical Game of the Year, The Wargamer, Games Magazine, and a few of Charles S. Roberts' Awards, including best of the year award for Heroes of the Gap.  Additionally, Mark Walker's novel World at War: Revelation was nominated for best game-related publication at the 2011 Origins Game Convention.

Complete product line up

Tabletop Board Games

Lock 'n Load Tactical: 

 Lock 'n Load: Band of Heroes (2005)
 Lock 'n Load: Swift and Bold (2007)
 Lock 'n Load: Not One Step Back (2007)
 Lock 'n Load Tactical: Battle Pack Alpha (2007)
 Dark July 43 Expansion: Lock 'n Load Tactical (2008)
 Noville Bastogne's Outpost Expansion: Lock 'n Load Tactical (2009)
 Lock 'n Load: A Ring of Hills (2009)
 Lock 'n Load Tactical: Battle Pack Bravo (2009)
 Days of Villainy: Lock 'n Load Tactical (2015)
 Lock 'n Load Tactical Core Rules: Lock 'n Load Tactical
 Lock 'n Load Tactical Core Rules Handbook: Lock 'n Load Tactical
 Lock 'n Load Tactical Player Aids: Lock 'n Load Tactical
 Lock 'n Load Tactical Battle Generator: Lock 'n Load Tactical
 Lock 'n Load Tactical Skill Cards: Lock 'n Load Tactical
 Lock 'n Load Tactical Player Aids: Lock 'n Load Tactical
 Lock 'n Load Tactical Quick Reference Flip Cards: Lock 'n Load Tactical
 Starter Kit: Lock 'n Load Tactical
 Solo: Lock 'n Load Tactical
 Day of Heroes: Lock 'n Load Tactical
 Heroes of the Nam: Lock 'n Load Tactical
 Pledge of Honor Expansion: Lock 'n Load Tactical
 Heroes of Normandy: Lock 'n Load Tactical
 Heroes of Normandy The Untold Stories Expansion: Lock 'n Load Tactical
 We Stand Alone Expansion: Lock 'n Load Tactical
 Battles to the Rhine Expansion: Lock 'n Load Tactical
 Bear and the Jackal Expansion: Lock 'n Load Tactical
 Heroes Against the Red Star: Lock 'n Load Tactical
 Red Gauntlet Expansion: Lock 'n Load Tactical
 Heroes in Defiance: Lock 'n Load Tactical
 Heroes of the Pacific: Lock 'n Load Tactical
 Hell Frozen Over Expansion: Lock 'n Load Tactical
 Heroes of the Falklands: Lock 'n Load Tactical
 A Feat of Arms Expansion: Lock 'n Load Tactical
 Heroes of the Motherland: Lock 'n Load Tactical
 Valor of the 13th Expansion: Lock 'n Load Tactical
 Heroes of North Africa: Lock 'n Load Tactical
 Compendium Vol I: Lock 'n Load Tactical
 Compendium Vol II: Lock 'n Load Tactical
 Compendium Vol III: Lock 'n Load Tactical
 Compendium Vol IV: Lock 'n Load Tactical
 Heroes of the Bitter Harvest: Lock 'n Load Tactical
 Enemy At The Gates Expansion: Lock 'n Load Tactical
 Heroes of Grenada: Lock 'n Load Tactical

Nations At War: 
 White Star Rising Nations At War
 Desert Heat: Nations At War
 Stalin's Triumph: Nations At War
 Compendium Vol I: Nations At War
 Solo Assistant: Nations At War
 Starter Kit: Nations At War

World at War 85: 
 Storming the Gap: World at War 85
 Storm and Steel: World at War 85
 Defense of Frankfurt: World at War 85
 Drive on Giessen: World at War 85

Nuklear Winter 68: 
 Nuklear Winter 68
 Heart of Darkness Expansion: Nuklear Winter 68

Space Infantry: 
 Space Infantry Resurgence
 Space Infantry Resurgence Expansion Box
 Space Infantry Federation
 Space Infantry Resurgence Core Rules

Tank On Tank: 
 West Front: Tank On Tank
 West Front Defenders of the Rhine: Tank On Tank
 East Front: Tank On Tank
 East Front Red Storm in the Valley: Tank On Tank

Battles On Demand: 
 The Day is Ours: Battles On Demand
 Atlanta Campaign: Battles On Demand
 Bougainville – The Forgotten Campaign: Battles On Demand
 Totensonntag: Battles On Demand
 Dawn's Early Light – Red Hammer: Corps Command
 Raid and Riposte: Battles On Demand
 It Started Here: Battles On Demand
 Wake Island – A Heroic Defiance: Battles On Demand
 Against the Odds: Battles On Demand
 No Honor in Surrender: Battles On Demand
 Lee At Gettysburg: Battles On Demand
 Rommel At Gazala: Battles On Demand
 Summer Lightning: Battles On Demand
 The Devils Beach – The Omaha Landings: Battles On Demand
 Bloody Mohawk: Battles On Demand
 Savage Wilderness: Battles On Demand
 Battle at Guilford's Courthouse: Battles On Demand

Other games: 
 Ammo Crate
 A Wing and A Pray – Bombing the Reich
 The Pacific War
 Falling Stars Beginner Game
 Falling Stars Core Rules
 Falling Stars Into the Long Dark Night Adventure
 All Things Zombie
 All Things Zombie: Reloaded
 All Things Zombie: Fade to Black
 All Things Zombie: Nowhere Nevada

Digital Computer Games

Lock 'n Load Tactical Digital: 

 Lock 'n Load Tactical Digital: Core Game (2020) (WW2 & Vietnam War settings. Updated engine & 5.0 rules from old 2014 edition's 3.5-4.0 rules.)

Tools/Misc:
 Lock 'n Load Tactical Digital: Battle Generator & Editor (2021)

World War II content:
 Lock 'n Load Tactical Digital: Heroes of the Bitter Harvest Battlepack 1 (2021)
 Lock 'n Load Tactical Digital: Valor of the 13th Battlepack (2021)
 Lock 'n Load Tactical Digital: Heroes of Normandy Battlepack 1 (2020)
 Lock 'n Load Tactical Digital: Heroes of Normandy Battlepack 2 (2021)
 Lock 'n Load Tactical Digital: Battles to the Rhine Battlepack (2021)
 Lock 'n Load Tactical Digital: Heroes in Defiance Battlepack 1 (2021)
 Lock 'n Load Tactical Digital: Heroes of the Pacific Battlepack 1 (2021)
 Lock 'n Load Tactical Digital: For the Emperor Battlepack (2021)
 Lock 'n Load Tactical Digital: Heroes of North Africa Battlepack 1 (2021)
 Lock 'n Load Tactical Digital: Noville Bastogne's Outpost Battlepack (TBA)
 Lock 'n Load Tactical Digital: Enemy at the Gates Battlepack (2022)
 Lock 'n Load Tactical Digital: We Stand Alone Battlepack (TBA)
 Lock 'n Load Tactical Digital: The Untold Stories Battlepack (TBA)
 Lock 'n Load Tactical Digital: Hell Frozen Over Battlepack (TBA)
 Lock 'n Load Tactical Digital: Heroes of the Motherland Battlepack 1 (TBA)

Vietnam War content:
 Lock 'n Load Tactical Digital: Heroes of the Nam Battlepack 1 (2020)
 Lock 'n Load Tactical Digital: Heroes of the Nam Battlepack 2 (2021)
 Lock 'n Load Tactical Digital: Pledge of Honor Battlepack (2022)

Other wars:
 Lock 'n Load Tactical Digital: Heroes of the Falklands Battlepack 1 (2020)
 Lock 'n Load Tactical Digital: Days of Villainy Battlepack (2020) (Libyan Crisis, 2011)
 Lock 'n Load Tactical Digital: Day of Heroes – Battlepack 1 (2022) (Battle of Mogadishu, 1993)
 Lock 'n Load Tactical Digital: Bear and the Jackal Battlepack (TBA) (Soviet-Afghan War)
 Lock 'n Load Tactical Digital: Heroes of Grenada (TBA) (U.S. invasion of Grenada, 1983)

Fictional settings/themes:
 Lock 'n Load Tactical Digital: Heroes Against the Red Star Battlepack 1 (2020) (Cold War)
 Lock 'n Load Tactical Digital: Red Gauntlet Battlepack (2021) (Cold War)
 Lock 'n Load Tactical Digital: Space Infantry Above and Beyond Battle Pack 1 (TBA) (Exoplanet, sci-fi)
 Lock 'n Load Tactical Digital: Zombies The Final Battle Battlepack 1 (TBA) (Zombie theme. WW2 to modern day.)

Nations At War Digital: 
 Nations At War Digital: Core Game (2020)
 Nations At War Digital: White Star Rising Battlepack 1 (2020)
 Nations At War Digital: White Star Rising Battlepack 2 (2020)
 Nations At War Digital: Desert Heat Battlepack 1 (TBA)
 Nations At War Digital: Desert Heat Battlepack 2 (TBA)
 Nations At War Digital: Stalin's Triumph Battlepack 1 (TBA)
 Nations At War Digital: Stalin's Triumph Battlepack 2 (TBA)

Command Ops: 
 Command Ops 2 Core Engine (2015)
 Command Ops 2 Vol 1: Highway to the Reich (2015)
 Command Ops 2 Vol 2: Foothills of the Gods (2015)
 Command Ops 2 Vol 3: Ride of the Valkyries (2015)
 Command Ops 2 Vol 4: Bastogne (2015)
 Command Ops 2 Vol 5: The Cauldron (2015)
 Command Ops 2 Vol 6: Knock On All Doors (2015)
 Command Ops 2 Vol 7: Westwall (2015)

Other video games: 
 Mark H. Walker's Lock 'n Load: Heroes of Stalingrad (2014) (Old engine & rules (3.5 to 4.0))
 Falling Stars War of Empires (2016)
 Tank On Tank Digital - West Front (2017)
 Tank On Tank Digital - East Front Battlepack 1 (2017)
 Victory & Glory – The American Civil War (2020)

Audio and Paperback Books 
 Space Infantry: Outpost 13
 Storming the Gap: First Strike
 Storm and Steel: Second Wave
 An Army of Two
 The Ghost Insurgency
 Heroes of Normandy: The Untold Stories
 Edge of the Line

Magazine Issues 
 Line of Fire Magazine #1 (PDF Only)
 Line of Fire Magazine #2 (PDF Only)
 Line of Fire Magazine #3 (PDF Only)
 Line of Fire Magazine #4 (PDF Only)
 Line of Fire Magazine #5 (PDF Only)
 Line of Fire Magazine #6 (PDF Only)
 Line of Fire Magazine #7 (PDF Only)
 Line of Fire Magazine #8 (PDF Only)
 Line of Fire Magazine #9 (PDF Only)
 Line of Fire Magazine #10 (PDF Only)
 Line of Fire Magazine #11 (PDF Only)
 Line of Fire Magazine #12 (PDF Only)
 Line of Fire Magazine #13 (PDF Only)
 Line of Fire Magazine #15 (PDF Only)
 Line of Fire Magazine #14 (PDF Only)
 Line of Fire Magazine #15 (PDF Only)

In Development 
 Point Blank V is for Victory
 Blood and Fury: World At War 85
 Heroes of the Bitter Harvest: Lock 'n Load Tactical
 Enemy At The Gates Expansion: Lock 'n Load Tactical
 Heroes of Grenada: Lock 'n Load Tactical

References

External links 
Official Site
Lock 'n Load Forums
Lock 'n Load Store

Board game publishing companies
Video game publishers
Video game companies established in 2006
Companies based in Colorado
Video game companies of the United States
Publishing companies established in 2006
2006 establishments in Colorado